State elections were held in South Australia on 10 March 1973. All 47 seats in the South Australian House of Assembly were up for election. The incumbent Australian Labor Party led by Premier of South Australia Don Dunstan won a second term in government, defeating the Liberal and Country League led by Leader of the Opposition Bruce Eastick.

Background
Parliamentary elections for both houses of the Parliament of South Australia were held in South Australia in 1973, which saw Don Dunstan and the Australian Labor Party win a second successive term, against the Liberal and Country League (LCL) led by Bruce Eastick.

It was only the second time that a Labor government in South Australia had been re-elected for a second term, the first being the early Thomas Price Labor government. It would be the first five-year-incumbent Labor government however.

Moderate Liberal Movement forces within the LCL broke away to form its own party led by Steele Hall after the election in 1973. The LCL became the South Australian Division of the Liberal Party of Australia a year after the election.

The Country Party also won a seat for the first time in Flinders, and finished second after preferences with no Labor candidate in five LCL seats − Rocky River, Mallee, Alexandra, Goyder and Victoria.

A 1973 Semaphore by-election and a 1974 Goyder by-election were triggered. Labor and the Liberal Movement easily retained their respective seats.

Key dates
 Issue of writ: 20 February 1973
 Close of nominations: 27 February 1973
 Polling day: 10 March 1973
 Return of writ: On or before 10 April 1973

Results

House of Assembly

|}

Legislative Council

|}

Post-election pendulum

See also
Results of the South Australian state election, 1973 (House of Assembly)
Results of the 1973 South Australian state election (Legislative Council)
Members of the South Australian House of Assembly, 1973–1975
Members of the South Australian Legislative Council, 1973–1975

References
History of South Australian elections 1857–2006, volume 1: House of Assembly, by Dean Jaensch, published by History Trust of SA and State Electoral Office of SA.
History of South Australian elections 1857–2006, volume 2: Legislative Council , by Dean Jaensch, published by History Trust of SA and State Electoral Office of SA.
Historical lower house results, ABC
Historical upper house results, ABC
State and federal election results  in Australia since 1890, University of WA

Specific

Elections in South Australia
1973 elections in Australia
1970s in South Australia
March 1973 events in Australia